Solomos Square is a square at the intersection of Rigenis Street and Omirou Avenue in central Nicosia, Cyprus. It is the location of the city's central bus station, and it is estimated that over 50,000 people pass through it daily. The square was remodelled in 2010, following the initiative of former Mayor Eleni Mavrou.

Buses
Nicosia has an organised network of urban buses that it was managed by the Nicosia Buses Company Ltd, but after the modernization of the Cyprus' buses system is managed by OSEL (District of Nicosia's Transport Organisation). The most bus routes start at the terminal in Solomos Square. Buses run every 20 to 30 minutes, depending on their destination, while on weekends they run less frequently.

Gallery

References

Buildings and structures in Nicosia
Squares in Nicosia
National squares